Karachi: The Musical is Pakistan's first original Broadway-style Urdu musical, with music by Hamza Jafri and lyrics by Faraz Lodhi. Set in the Lyari area of Karachi, the story revolves around an aspiring boxer, Saif Salam, who travels from Mailsi to train with the country's best boxing coach, Ghulam Bashir. It guest-starred Munawar Saeed as Dara Jokhio, a former gangster.

Productions
The musical opened in Karachi on 22 October 2011 and ran until 13 November. An all Pakistan tour was planned for March 2012. The show's band included Asad Zafar (Guitarist), Sheraz (Tabla), Manzoor Ahmed (Violinist), Joshua Fernandes  (Drummer), and Danish Manzoor (Keyboardist).

Director, Producer and Choreographer: Nida Butt
 Writers: Faraz Lodhi and Uns Mufti
 Co Producer: Waqas Bukhari
 Assistant Director: Alina Iftikhar
 Production Manager: Usman Mazhar
 Volunteer Head: Eleyna Haroun
 Lighting Director: Amna Soomro
 Set Designer: Khizer Farooq Aslam Bandey
 Photographer: Adil Mufti

Synopsis
Saif Salaam (Imam Syed) travels from Mailsi, Multan to train with Pakistan's best boxing coach, Ghulam Bashir (Faraz Lodhi), who owned the Ghulam Bashir Boxing club in Lyari. But there is one catch: Bashir has not coached anyone in the last two decades since he had a falling out with his best friend Daud Islam (Adnan Jaffar), who now runs the local mafia that controls drugs, prostitution, and betting houses in one of the most troubled parts of the city.

As Saif learns how to spar, he realizes that his decision to train for a professional boxing career has sparked tension between the age old rivals, put the livelihood of thousands in the area at risk, and exposed his family to grave danger.

Cast
 Faraz Lodhi as Ghulam Bashir
 Syed Adnan Jaffar as Daud Islam, the local gangster.
 Imam Syed as Saif Salam
 Rubya Chaudhry as Yasmeen, a reporter
 Munawar Saeed as Dara Jokhio, a former gangster, who still holds sway over the area.
 Raza Shah as Raza Baloch, a former boxer who is on the run from the law.
 Monazza Fatima Naqvi as Tabassum (Tabu)
 Younas Khan as Mir
 Merium Azmi as Selina
 Aryaan Aslam as KK
 Kamal Hussain as Raheem Ibad
 Muhammad Shakeel Hussain Khan as Jugnu
 Arshad Malik: Arsi
 Hamid Yousuf Khan as Sikandar
 Asif Shehzad Malik as Saniullah/News Reporter/Yasir Khan
 Ahsan Ali as Wajiullah/News Reporter/Imam
 Zakiullah Khan as Inspector Rehman/Asif
 Danish Hayat as Clement

Songs
An official soundtrack for the Musical was released which consists of the first six songs.
 Lyari
 Karachi
 Ek Sae Dus (One to ten)
 Aaye Re Main Aaye
 Babu Bhai
 Left Right Jab
 Chaand
 Shor Machao
 Jin
 Aur De
 Daaka
 New York

References

Pakistani music
Theatre in Pakistan
Theatre in Sindh
2011 musicals